The Smith Ranch, in Johnson County, Texas near Rio Vista, Texas, and also known as Grand Valley Lands, was established in 1887. It was listed on the National Register of Historic Places in 2007.

It includes a Recorded Texas Historic Landmark.

The main house is a two-story house built in 1887, using square nails.

German prisoners-of-war, from the Afrika Corps, worked on the farm.

References

Ranches in Texas
National Register of Historic Places in Johnson County, Texas
Buildings and structures completed in 1887